Cybercom Group is an information technology consulting company. It was founded in 1995 in Stockholm, Sweden.

The group has approximately 1,300 employees (2016). Cybercom's principal market is the Nordic region, with established operations in Sweden, Finland and Denmark. Poland, India, Dubai and Singapore partly support the Nordic business and partly represent their own specialized business.

Cybercom's offering is organised into four areas: Digitalization, Internet of Things, Secure Connectivity, and Managed Cloud. In these areas the company offers strategic advice, testing and quality assurance, security solutions, system development, system integration, system management and system operation.

Cybercom's clients are mainly in telecoms, industry and the public sector, as well as in commerce and the media. Some of the largest clients are Alma Media Group, Cable & Wireless Communications, Ericsson, Finnish National Board of Education, Millicom, MTV Oy, Swedish National Police Board, Saab Group, Swedish Tax Agency, Sony Mobile, Stockholm County Council, and Volvo.

UN Secretary General Ban Ki-moon and Swedish Prime Minister Fredrik Reinfeldt visited Cybercom's head office in Stockholm and talked about the challenges of the global labour market during his visit to Sweden in May 2014.

References

External links
 Cybercom Group's official website

Companies based in Stockholm
Information technology consulting firms of Sweden